Paolo Canè and Simone Colombo were the defending champions, but Canè did not compete this year. Colombo teamed up with Francesco Cancellotti and lost in the quarterfinals to Josef Čihák and Cyril Suk.

Leonardo Lavalle and Claudio Panatta won the title by defeating Petr Korda and Tomáš Šmíd 3–6, 6–4, 6–4 in the final.

Seeds

Draw

Draw

References

External links
 Official results archive (ATP)
 Official results archive (ITF)

Campionati Internazionali di Sicilia
1987 Grand Prix (tennis)
Camp